was an Indian teacher and philosopher who lived around the 6th century BCE, contemporaneous with Mahavira and the Buddha.  He was an atomist who believed in atomism which believed that everything is made of seven eternal elements – earth, water, fire, air, happiness, pain and soul.

Early life 
According to the Pali Canon, Kacayana was his family name and he is said to have belonged to a Brahmin caste. He was sometimes called Pakkudha Katiyana, or Kadhudha Katiyana.

Teachings 

According to Pakudha, there are seven eternal "elements": Earth, Water, Fire, Air, Joy, Sorrow and Life.  Pakudha further asserted that these elements do not interact with one another.

The Samannaphala Sutta (DN 2) represents Pakudha's views as follows:
"'...[T]here are these seven substances — unmade, irreducible, uncreated, without a creator, barren, stable as a mountain-peak, standing firm like a pillar — that do not alter, do not change, do not interfere with one another, are incapable of causing one another pleasure, pain, or both pleasure and pain. Which seven? The earth-substance, the liquid-substance, the fire-substance, the wind-substance, pleasure, pain, and the soul as the seventh. These are the seven substances — unmade, irreducible, uncreated, without a creator, barren, stable as a mountain-peak, standing firm like a pillar — that do not alter, do not change, do not interfere with one another, and are incapable of causing one another pleasure, pain, or both pleasure and pain.
"'And among them there is no killer nor one who causes killing, no hearer nor one who causes hearing, no cognizer nor one who causes cognition. When one cuts off [another person's] head, there is no one taking anyone's life. It is simply between the seven substances that the sword passes.'"

In the Brahmajala Sutta (DN 1), theories such as Pakudha's are labeled as "Atomic theory" and "eternalism".

According to Buddhaghosa, he suffered from many obsessional rituals with regard to the use of water:a voided the use of cold water, using always hot; when this was not available, he did not wash. If he crossed a stream he would consider this as a sin, and would make expiation by constructing a mound of earth.

He did not speak of God, soul and the other world which has led some scholars considered him also as a materialist.

Followers 
According to Buddhist sources, Pakudha's followers did not hold him in high esteem, in contrast to the devotion felt for the Buddha by his followers. Pakudha did not welcome questions, and displayed annoyance and resentment when cross examined. Elsewhere however, he is spoken of as having been highly honoured by the people, a teacher of large and well reputed schools, with numerous followers. But he did not lay claim to perfect enlightenment .

Empedocles is known as Pakudha Kaccayana of Greece.

See also 
 Shramana
 Samannaphala Sutta
 Brahmajala Sutta
 Merit (Buddhism)

Notes

Sources 
 Bhaskar, Bhagchandra Jain (1972). Jainism in Buddhist Literature. Alok Prakashan: Nagpur. Available on-line at http://jainfriends.tripod.com/books/jiblcontents.html.
 Ñāṇamoli, Bhikkhu (trans.) and Bodhi, Bhikkhu (ed.) (2001). The Middle-Length Discourses of the Buddha: A Translation of the Majjhima Nikāya. Boston: Wisdom Publications. .
 Rhys Davids, T.W. & William Stede (eds.) (1921-5). The Pali Text Society’s Pali–English Dictionary. Chipstead: Pali Text Society. A general on-line search engine for the PED is available at http://dsal.uchicago.edu/dictionaries/pali/.
 Thanissaro Bhikkhu (trans.) (1997). Samaññaphala Sutta: The Fruits of the Contemplative Life (DN 2). Available on-line at http://www.accesstoinsight.org/tipitaka/dn/dn.02.0.than.html.
 Walshe, Maurice O'Connell (trans.) (1995). The Long Discourses of the Buddha: A Translation of the Dīgha Nikāya. Somerville: Wisdom Publications. .

Spiritual teachers
Year of death unknown
Year of birth unknown
5th-century BC Indian philosophers
5th-century BC Hindus
4th-century BC Indian philosophers
4th-century BC Hindus